Copelatus elutus is a species of diving beetle. It is part of the genus Copelatus in the subfamily Copelatinae of the family Dytiscidae. It was described by Félix Guignot in 1958.

References

elutus
Beetles described in 1958